Kalaveh (also Romanized as Kalāveh) is a village in Badr Rural District, in the Central District of Ravansar County, Kermanshah Province, Iran. At the 2006 census, its population was 101, in 22 families.

References 

Populated places in Ravansar County